The Mexico Ice Hockey Federation is the governing body that oversees Ice hockey in Mexico.

References

External links
Official website 
Mexico at IIHF.com

Ice hockey in Mexico
Mexico
Ice hockey